Pseudoblepharispermum is a genus of flowering plants in the daisy family, native to East Africa.

 Species
 Pseudoblepharispermum bremeri J.-P.Lebrun & Stork - Ethiopia
 Pseudoblepharispermum mudugense Beentje & D.J.N.Hind - Somalia

References

Inuleae
Asteraceae genera